Foo is a placeholder name in computer-related documentation.

Foo or FOO may also refer to:

People 
 Adeline Foo, Singaporean writer
 Cedric Foo (born 1960), Singaporean politician
 Ching Ling Foo (1854–1922), Chinese magician
 Foo Choo Choon (1860-1921), Malaysian businessman
 Ernie Foo (1891–1934), Australian rules footballer
 Jon Foo (born 1982), English actor, martial artist and stuntman
 Jonathan Foo (born 1990), Guyanese cricketer
 Mark Foo (1958–1994), American surfer
 Ruby Foo (1904-1950), restaurateur 
 Sharin Foo (born 1973), Danish musician
 Stephanie Foo (born 1987), American radio producer

Places 
 Foo Lake, in Wisconsin, United States
 Foo Pass, in Switzerland

Other uses 
 Foo (game), a dice game
 Foo?, an album by the band Porno Graffiti
 Foobar, a placeholder name in computing
 Foo Camp, a hacker event
 Foo gas or fougasse, a type of explosive mine
 Forward observation officer
 A nonsense word used in the Smokey Stover comic strip
 Foo fighter, mysterious aerial phenomena seen during World War II
 Foo Fighters, an American rock band
 Foo was here, an Australian graffiti signature of popular culture

See also

 FUBAR (disambiguation)
 
 Phoo
 Phu (disambiguation)
 Fu (disambiguation)